Stick 2 the Script is the second studio album by East Coast hip hop producer Statik Selektah. It was released by Showoff Records and Brick Records on October 21, 2008. It is composed of 18 tracks—all containing production from Statik Selektah and rapping from featured artists. Much like Selektah's debut album, the album features well-established New York City rappers like Jadakiss, Q-Tip and Talib Kweli. It additionally features newer artists like Jon Hope and Reks, as well as Southern rappers like Bun B, West Coast rappers like Mistah F.A.B. and a slew of Massachusetts rappers on the song "Streets of M.A.". DJ Premier ranked the album 3rd in his top 20 albums of 2008 list.

Track listing
All songs produced by Statik Selektah

References

2008 albums
Statik Selektah albums
Albums produced by Statik Selektah